The Latin Grammy Award for Best Rock Song is an honor presented annually at the Latin Grammy Awards, a ceremony that recognizes excellence and creates a wider awareness of cultural diversity and contributions of Latin recording artists in the United States and internationally. The award is reserved to the songwriters of a new song containing at least 51% of the lyrics in Spanish. Instrumental recordings or cover songs are not eligible. Songs in Portuguese may be entered in the Brazilian field.

The award has been given every year since the 1st Latin Grammy Awards ceremony being presented to the Argentine singer-songwriter Fito Páez with the song "Al Lado del Camino".

The award has been presented to songwriters originating from Argentina, Colombia and Mexico. Colombian musician Juanes is the biggest winner in this category, having won in all the four occasions he's been nominated for (2001, 2002, 2003 and 2005). Other multiple winners are Gustavo Cerati with three wins out of four nominations and Emmanuel de Real of Café Tacvba winning twice. Beto Cuevas holds the record for most nominations without a win with four.

Recipients

2000s

2010s

2020s

 Each year is linked to the article about the Latin Grammy Awards held that year.
 The performing artist is only listed but does not receive the award.
 Showing the name of the songwriter(s), the nominated song and in parentheses the performer's name(s).

See also
Latin Grammy Award for Best Rock Album
Latin Grammy Award for Song of the Year
Lo Nuestro Award for Rock/Alternative Song of the Year

References

External links
Official site of the Latin Grammy Awards

 
Latin Grammy Awards for rock music
Song awards
Rock Song
Songwriting awards